Interstate 635 (I-635) is a connector highway between I-35 in Overland Park, Kansas, and I-29 in Kansas City, Missouri, approximately  long. It is mostly in the US state of Kansas, servicing the city of Kansas City, Kansas, but extends into Kansas City, Missouri, as well. The freeway's southern terminus is at a stack interchange with I-35. South of this, the mainline becomes an expressway carrying U.S. Route 69 (US 69).

The freeway provides a route around Downtown Kansas City by crossing through residential areas of Kansas City, Kansas, and Riverside, Missouri. It also provides another direct route to Kansas City International Airport.

Route description

Kansas

I-635 begins at I-35 in Johnson County near Shawnee, Kansas, at exit 1A. There is a parclo interchange with Merriam Drive at exit 1B almost immediately after its terminus. It then enters Wyandotte County and Kansas City, Kansas. There is a diamond interchange with Shawnee Drive at exit 1C and a parclo interchange with Metropolitan Avenue at exit 1A upon entering the Argentine neighborhood. There is an interchange with K-32/Kansas Avenue at exit 3 and then crosses the Kansas River into central Kansas City, Kansas. Immediately after crossing the river, there is an interchange with I-70 at exits 4A and 4B. There are several interchanges further north, including State Avenue (exit 5), Parallel Parkway (exit 6), and Leavenworth Road and North 38th Street (exit 7). The last public interchange before entering Missouri is K-5. A private maintenance facility crossing at grade exists between this exit and the Missouri River.

Missouri
Like I-435, I-635's mileposts do not reset after crossing into Missouri.

I-635 crosses the Missouri River from Kansas into Platte County and the city of Riverside, Missouri. There is an interchange with Horizons Parkway at exit 9 and then US 69 at exit 10. US 69 briefly runs concurrently with I-635 north before exiting at the interchange with Route 9 (exits 11A and 11B). I-635 runs a few more miles north, then terminates at I-29/US 71 at exits 12A and 12B.

History

Missouri began the plans for I-635 in 1958 when American Association of State Highway and Transportation Officials (AASHTO) approved proposals that also included what would become I-435 and I-470; the plan for I-635 took the route eastward along what is now K-5 to US 69 and northward across the Fairfax Bridge toward I-29. When money from the Highway Trust Fund became available for a new Missouri River crossing, I-635 got a more westward alignment after 1968. Part of the original alignment was built as a spur going into Fairfax as K-5.

In 1990, the highway was given the name Harry Darby Memorial Highway, in honor of US Senator Harry Darby.

The interchange with I-70 and the bridge over the Santa Fe Railyard in Argentine were reconstructed in 2004.

Maintenance work on the bridge over the Missouri River finished in September 2005.

Exit list

References

External links

 Kansas Highway Maps: Current, Historic, KDOT

35-6 Kansas-Missouri
35-6
35-6
6
Transportation in Johnson County, Kansas
Transportation in Wyandotte County, Kansas
Transportation in Platte County, Missouri
Transportation in the Kansas City metropolitan area
1975 establishments in Kansas
1975 establishments in Missouri